Mian Deh (also Romanized as Mīān Deh, Meyān Deh, and Mīyāndeh) is a village in Kamal Rud Rural District, Qolqol Rud District, Tuyserkan County, Hamadan Province, Iran. At the 2006 census, its population was 866, in 215 families.

References 

Populated places in Tuyserkan County